Mingguang, formerly Jiashan County, is a county-level city in the northeast of Anhui Province, China, bordering Jiangsu province to the northeast and east. It is under the administration of Chuzhou city.

Geography
Mingguang City is on the north-eastern edge of Anhui Province. The Huai River forms part of its northeast border. Bordering county-level divisions are Lai'an County to the southeast, Nanqiao District to the south, Dingyuan County to the southwest, Fengyang County to the west, Wuhe County to the northwest, and, in Jiangsu, Sihong and Xuyi counties.

Climate
Mingguang City lies on the Northern Subtropical Zone.

Administrative divisions
Nowadays, Longzihu District is divided to 6 subdistricts, 12 towns and 1 township.

4 Subdistricts

12 Towns

1 Township
 Bogang

Demographics
Most of the people living in Mingguang City are Han people.
According to 2015 data, Mingguang has a total population of 655,000.

Economy
Mingguang's economy relies much on agriculture and its appendages.

Notable people
Wang Daohan
Zu Hai-actress
Jiang Daoping-revolutionary,

Tourism
Nv Shan Geographic Park

Education
According to 2016 data, Mingguang City has a total of 187 schools, including elementary schools, secondary schools, and places for higher learning.

References

 
Chuzhou
Cities in Anhui